Presidential, legislative and local elections were held on November 12, 1957 in the Philippines. Incumbent President Carlos P. Garcia won his opportunity to get a full term as President of the Philippines after the death of President Ramon Magsaysay in a plane crash in March 1957. His running mate, Senator Jose Laurel, Jr. lost to Pampanga Representative Diosdado Macapagal. This was the first time in Philippine electoral history where a president was elected by a plurality and not majority, and in which the president and vice president came from different parties.

Results

President

Vice president

Senate

House of Representatives

See also
Commission on Elections
Politics of the Philippines
Philippine elections
President of the Philippines
4th Congress of the Philippines

References

External links
 Official website of the Commission on Elections

1957
General election